David Szalay (born 1974 in Montreal, Quebec) is a Hungarian/English writer. His surname is pronounced SOL-loy.

Life 
Szalay was born in Montreal in 1974 to a  Canadian mother and a Hungarian father. His family then moved to Beirut. They were forced to leave Lebanon after the onset of the Lebanese Civil War. They then moved to London, where he attended Sussex House School. Szalay studied at the University of Oxford. After leaving university, Szalay worked various jobs in sales in London. He moved to Brussels, then to Pécs in Hungary to pursue his ambition of becoming a writer.
Szalay lives in Budapest, with his wife and two children.

Career 
Szalay has written a number of radio dramas for the BBC. His 2018 book of short stories Turbulence originated in a series of 15 minute programs for BBC Radio 4. The twelve stories of Turbulence follow different people on flights around the world. It explores the globalization of family and friendship in the 21st century. He won the Betty Trask Award for his first novel, London and the South-East, along with the Geoffrey Faber Memorial Prize. Since then he has written two other novels: Innocent (2009) and Spring (2011).

A linked collection of short stories, All That Man Is, was short listed for the Man Booker Prize and won the Gordon Burn Prize in 2016. The Spectator said that "nobody captures the super-sadness of modern Europe as well as Szalay." The Observer questioned its structure and whether or not it qualifies as a novel in the traditional sense: "does it in any sense work, as Jonathan Cape wants us to believe, as a novel? Yes, there’s a thematic consistency that makes this more than a collection, and Szalay even throws in the odd narrative link (the 73-year-old, it transpires, is the 17-year-old’s granddad). But still, a novel? I don’t think so."

Szalay was included in The Telegraph's 2016 list of the top 20 British writers under 40, as well as Granta magazine's 2013 list of the best young British novelists.

Bibliography

Novels
London and the South-East (U.K edition by Vintage Books, 2009; U.S. edition by Graywolf Press, 2017)
The Innocent (U.K edition by Vintage Books, 2010)
Spring (Graywolf Press, 2012)
All That Man Is (Graywolf Press, 2016)
Turbulence (Scribner, 2019)

Critical studies and reviews of Szalay's work

References 

1974 births
20th-century British novelists
21st-century British novelists
British male novelists
Living people
Writers from Montreal
20th-century British male writers
21st-century British male writers
People educated at Sussex House School